Parasakthi is a Tamil term that means the Hindu goddess Shakti. It may also refer to:

 Parasakthi (film), starring Sivaji Ganesan
 Adi Parasakthi, a Hindu deity
 Parashakti, a perfection of Hindu deity Lord Shiva
 Aathi Parasakthi, a 1971 Tamil film based on the Hindu deity
 Sri Parasakthi College for Women